Calf Island may refer to:

 Calf Island (Connecticut)
 Calf Island (Massachusetts)
 Calf Island (Michigan)
 Calf Island (New York), near Galloo Island

See also
 Calf of Man
 Calf of Eday
 Calf of Flotta